Belanitsa (Bulgarian: Беланица, also transliterated Belanica) is a village in western Bulgaria. It is located in Oblast Pernik, Obshtina Radomir.

Geography 
The village of Belanitsa is located in the lowest part of the Radomir field: The village of Priboy is nearby.

References 

 www.grao.bg

Villages in Pernik Province